Mary Jepkosgei Keitany (born 18 January 1982) is a Kenyan former professional long distance runner. She is the world record holder in a women-only marathon, having won the 2017 London Marathon in a time of 2:17:01. As of November 2022, she placed fifth on the world all-time list at the marathon and eleventh on the respective world all-time list for the half marathon.

Her former half marathon best of 1:05:50 (2011) lived three years as the women's world record. She also has held world bests at 10 miles (50:05 minutes), 20 kilometres (1:02:36), and 25 kilometres (1:19:53), all of which were set in road races. In August 2018, she was honored by the Shoe4Africa foundation who funded and built the Mary Keitany Shoe4Africa school in Torokwonin, Baringo County, Kenya.  She and her husband Charles sit on the Shoe4Africa school board.

Career
Born in Kabarnet, Baringo County, Keitany started running while in primary school. In 2002, she joined the Hidden Talent Academy.

2006
In January, she placed 21st in her first senior race at the Shoe4Africa 5 kilometre women's race.

2007
She won a silver medal at the World Road Running Championships, finishing second to Lornah Kiplagat who broke the world record.

2009
After a year out due to pregnancy, she returned to competition at the World 10K Bangalore in May. She set a new personal best but finished one second behind winner Aselefech Mergia.

In September, she won the Lille Half Marathon with a finish time of 1:07:00, which was the seventh fastest of all-time.

This performance qualified her for the World Half Marathon Championships in Birmingham, where she outpaced Aberu Kebede to win her first world championship, set a new personal best of 1:06:36, and broke the championship record. She won a second gold medal as part of the winning Kenyan squad in the team competition. Reflecting on the win, she noted, "It's my best ever time, so I'm so happy.... I had a baby just 1 year and 3 months ago." Her 15 kilometre interval time, 46:51 minutes, was faster than the world record of 46:55 held by Kayoko Fukushi of Japan; however, Keitany's time was not ratified as a new world record because of the lower elevation of the 15 kilometre mark compared to the race start. Her time was the second fastest ever in the half marathon (after Lornah Kiplagat). The half marathon time was a new African record, with the previous record of 1:06:44 hours set by Elana Meyer of South Africa in 1999. Keitany also beat the previous Kenyan record of 1:06:48 that she set in Udine two years earlier. The director of the New York City Marathon, Mary Wittenberg, suggested that she could become a world-beater over the full marathon distance in the coming years.

2010
She won the Abu Dhabi Half Marathon.

She also won the Berlin 25 kilometre race, setting a new world record of 1:19:53 hours. The previous record was set by Mizuki Noguchi of Japan in 2005. Keitany finished almost five minutes ahead of runner-up Alice Timbilili.

In preparing for the New York City Marathon, she won the Portugal Half Marathon in Lisbon in September, leading from the front to win largely uncontested in a time of 1:08:46.

In her debut at the New York City Marathon, she was among the leading three for much of the race but faded to finish third in a time of 2:29:01 hours.

2011
Keitany began the year in record-breaking form as she won the Ras Al Khaimah Half Marathon with a world record time of 1:05:50 hours. This marked the first time a woman had run the distance in under 1:06 hours on a non-aided course. She also set other records along the way, including a world record of 1:02:36 for 20 kilometres and world best times for 8 kilometres and 10 miles.

She then won the London Marathon in a time of 2:19:17, pulling away from the field at the 14-mile mark and becoming the fourth fastest woman ever over the marathon distance.

In September, she won the Portugal Half Marathon for the second time and improved upon her own course record with a winning time of 1:07:54 hours.

She was the pre-race favourite for the New York City Marathon, where she built a significant lead by the halfway point (running at more than four minutes faster than the course record). She slowed dramatically, however, in the second half of the race and was overtaken by Firehiwot Dado and Buzunesh Deba, leaving her in third place with a finishing time of 2:23:38 hours.

2012
She intended to improve her world record mark at the Ras Al Khaimah Half Marathon, but windy conditions slowed her to a finish time of 1:06:49 hours.

At the London Marathon, she broke Catherine Ndereba's African record with a winning time of 2:18:37 hours and became the third fastest woman ever at this distance.

At the Summer Olympics in London, she ran a fast pace among the lead pack until the 41 kilometre mark, where she fell behind to finish fourth.

2013
She announced her pregnancy at the start of 2013 and skipped that year's competitions.

2014
On 2 November, Keitany battled with eventual second-place finisher Jemima Sumgong to win the New York City Marathon in a time of 2:25:07.

2015
At the London Marathon, Keitany was one of the "Fantastic Four" of Kenyans (consisting of Keitany, Edna Kiplagat, Florence Kiplagat, and Priscah Jeptoo) who were expected to win the race and possibly challenge Paula Radcliffe's course record (and women's world record). Down the last stretch of the race, Keitany battled Ethiopian Tirfi Tsegaye, with Keitany finishing second in 2:23:40 hours, 18 seconds behind winner Tigist Tufa from Ethiopia. Keitany remarked after the race that she was affected by the wind and cold weather.

2016
Keitany won the New York City Marathon in 2:24:26 hours. Sally Kipyego finished second (2:28:01), with Molly Huddle in third (2:28:13). Keitany won the 2016 Bix 7 Road Race in Davenport, Iowa in 35:18 and set the course record for women.

2017
In April, Keitany won the London Marathon, setting a new world record (women only) at 2:17:01 hours. She bettered Radcliffe's record by 41 seconds, which she set at the 2005 London Marathon. Tirunesh Dibaba finished second, 55 seconds behind. (Radcliffe has run a faster time in a mixed gender event, but that is a separate record.) Her 1st half marathon split time was 1:06:54 hours.

Earlier in February the same year, Keitany finished the Ras Al Khaimah Half Marathon second (1:05.13) after  Peres Jepchirchir, whose 1:05:06  finish time set a new world record. The third, fourth, and fifth-place finishers (Joyciline Jepkosgei,  Jemima Sumgong, and Tirunesh Dibaba) also set new personal bests.

She won the TD Beach to Beacon 10k on 5 August 2017 in a course record time of 30:41 minutes. She improved the cr set at last year's run.

Keitany did not compete at the World Championships in London.

On 10 September 2017, Keitany won the 2017 Great North Run in 1:05:59, 20 seconds off her course record from 2014.

On 5 November 2017, she finished second at the New York City Marathon at a time of 2:27:54.

2018
On 4 November 2018, Keitany won the New York City Marathon in a time of 2:22:48, a time just 17 seconds off the course record. For the first half she needed 75:30 and the second 66:58, in a women-only race. Her 10 km interval times were 37:07, 35:02, 31:33, 31:47 and 7:19 for the last 2.195 km. Keitany's time between km 25 and km 35 was 30:53. Vivian Cheruiyot was the runner up in 2:26:02, and the previous year's winner Shalane Flanagan was in third place with 2:26:22.

2019
Keitany came second at the New York City Marathon behind half marathon world record holder and debutante Joyciline Jepkosgei in 2:23:32.

Retirement
Mary Keitany announced her retirement on 22 September 2021 aged 39 years. Her retirement was occasioned  by a hip injury she suffered during the 2019 London marathon, which restricted her training and performance.

Personal life
She is married to another runner Charles Koech and gave birth to her first child, Jared, in June 2008, and her second child, Samantha, in April 2013. She stopped training and other sporting activities at the third month of pregnancy, and resumed when the babies were six months old.
She trains in Iten, is managed by Gianni Demadonna.

Major competition record

World Marathon Majors results

Personal bests

References

External links

Focus on Athletes article from IAAF
Mary Jepkosgei Keitany profile and results from Association of Road Racing Statisticians

1982 births
Living people
People from Baringo County
Kenyan female long-distance runners
Kenyan female marathon runners
Olympic athletes of Kenya
Athletes (track and field) at the 2012 Summer Olympics
World Athletics Half Marathon Championships winners
London Marathon female winners
World Athletics record holders
New York City Marathon female winners
Recipients of the Association of International Marathons and Distance Races Best Marathon Runner Award